Hugh Segal  (born October 13, 1950) is a Canadian political strategist, author, commentator, academic, and former senator. He served as chief of staff to Ontario Premier Bill Davis and later to Canadian Prime Minister Brian Mulroney. Segal resigned from the Senate of Canada on June 15, 2014, as a result of his appointment as master (later principal) of Massey College in Toronto.

Life and career

Politics and public policy
Segal was inspired by a visit from Prime Minister John Diefenbaker in 1962 to his school, United Talmud Torah Academy in Montreal. Segal went on to graduate from the University of Ottawa and was an aide to federal Progressive Conservative Leader of the Opposition Robert Stanfield in the early 1970s, while still a university student.

At the age of 21, he was an unsuccessful Progressive Conservative candidate in Ottawa Centre for the House of Commons of Canada in the 1972 general election. He was defeated again in 1974.

As a member of the Big Blue Machine, Segal was a senior aide to Ontario Progressive Conservative Premier Bill Davis in the 1970s and 1980s, and he was named Deputy Minister at age 29. From 1992 to 1993, he was Chief of Staff to Prime Minister Brian Mulroney.

Segal finished second to Joe Clark after the first ballot of the 1998 Progressive Conservative leadership election, but he chose to withdraw and support Clark (the eventual winner) in the second ballot runoff vote against third-place finisher David Orchard. He had also briefly considered running for the PC leadership in 1993.

Senate

In 2005, Segal was appointed to the Senate of Canada by Liberal Prime Minister Paul Martin. He was the chairman of the Senate Foreign Affairs Committee until he "reluctantly" agreed to resign in 2007 at the request of the Conservative government, which reportedly wished to appoint a more ideologically conservative senator to the role after the committee issued a report critical of the Conservative government's foreign aid policy. Segal insisted, however, that the move was an administrative one. Segal later served as Chair of the Special Senate Committee on Anti-Terrorism.

In December 2013, he announced his intention to resign from the Senate in June 2014, twelve years before he would reach the mandatory retirement age of 75, to accept an academic appointment as Master of Massey College in Toronto.

Commonwealth
On July 7, 2010, he was appointed to the Commonwealth Eminent Persons Group (EPG) by Secretary General Kamalesh Sharma.  The group's mandate is to set out decisive recommendations on how to strengthen the Commonwealth and fulfill its potential in the 21st century. In December 2011 the federal government appointed him special envoy to the Commonwealth with the task of convincing individual countries to sign on to the EPG's 106 recommendations.

Political views
Segal espouses a moderate brand of conservatism that has little in common with British Thatcherism or US neoconservatism. He is a Red Tory in the tradition of Benjamin Disraeli, Sir John A. Macdonald, John Diefenbaker and his mentors Robert Stanfield and Bill Davis. This political philosophy stresses the common good and promotes social harmony between classes. It is often associated with One Nation Conservatism. The focus is on order, good government and mutual responsibility. Individual rights and personal freedom are not considered absolute. In his book Beyond Greed: A Traditional Conservative Confronts Neo-Conservative Excess (Toronto: Stoddart, 1997), Segal sought to distinguish what he called "traditional" conservatives from neo-conservatives, notably those in the United States.

In an earlier book, his 1996 memoir No Surrender (page 225), Segal wrote: "Progressive Conservatives cannot embrace the nihilistic defeatism that masquerades as a neo-conservative polemic in support of individual freedom and disengagement." He went on to deplore "American fast-food conservatism." In a speech to the National Press Club on June 21, 1995, Segal referred to the "selfish and directionless nature of the American revolution -- which was more about self-interest, mercantile opportunity, and who collected what tax than it was about tolerance or freedom."

Segal opposed on civil liberties grounds the imposition of the War Measures Act by Prime Minister Pierre Trudeau in the October Crisis of 1970. He favours strengthening Canada's military and encouraging investment, while maintaining a strong social safety net. His 1998 proposal to reduce Canada's Goods and Services Tax from 7% to 6% (and then 5%) was adopted by Stephen Harper and the Conservative Party in 2005. During his leadership campaign he stated his support for capital punishment. Segal's most recent book is The Long Road Back: The Conservative Journey, 1993-2006 (Toronto: HarperCollins, 2006).

On 6 June 2012, Segal had a comment published in the National Post outlining his views on Basic Income. In December 2012, Segal published an essay in the Literary Review of Canada promoting the benefits of a guaranteed annual income.

Journalism
In the 1980s and 1990s, Segal became a television pundit and newspaper columnist. In the private sector, Segal has been an executive in the advertising, brewing, and financial services industries.

Publishing
Segal's book Two Freedoms: Canada's Global Future was published by Dundurn Press in April 2016.

Published by On Point Press, an imprint of UBC Press on October 15 of 2019, Segal released his second book, Bootstraps Need Boots: One Tory’s Lonely Fight to End Poverty in Canada.

Academic work
Segal lives in Kingston, Ontario, and until 2014 was a faculty member at Queen's University's School of Policy Studies, and has also taught at the university's school of business. He served as president of the Institute for Research on Public Policy, a Montreal think tank, from 1999 to 2006. He sits on the board of directors and is a distinguished fellow at the Canadian Defence and Foreign Affairs Institute. He is also a member of the Trilateral Commission.

Segal was appointed Master of Massey College in the University of Toronto (effective at the end of June 2014) and retired from the Senate in order to accept the position. He retired from the Massey College position effective June 30, 2019, five years into his seven-year term, and was succeeded by Nathalie Des Rosiers.

Honours
In 2003, Segal was made a Member of the Order of Canada which was later promoted to the grade of Officer. Segal holds an honorary doctorate degree from the Royal Military College of Canada, University of Ottawa and Queen's University.
Hugh Segal was named honorary captain in the Royal Canadian Navy in 2004. 
He was made chair of the NATO Association of Canada in 2013.
In 2013, Hugh Segal was honored with a Peace Patron Award by The Mosaic Institute, an NGO based in Toronto working to promote pluralism reducing conflict in Canada and abroad.
In 2016, he was made a member of the Order of Ontario.
 In 2017 He was awarded the Canadian Forces Decoration (CD) for 12 years service with the Royal Canadian Navy.

Family
He is the brother of corporate executive and former university administrator Brian Segal, and of artist Seymour Segal. He is married to Donna Armstrong Segal, a former Ontario Ministry of Health executive. They have one daughter, Jacqueline.

Electoral record
1998 Progressive Conservative Party of Canada leadership election

1974 Canadian federal election - Ottawa Centre

1972 Canadian federal election - Ottawa Centre

References

External links
Hugh Segal fonds at Queen's University Archives
 

1950 births
Canadian political consultants
Canadian senators from Ontario
Chiefs of staff of the Canadian Prime Minister's Office
Conservative Party of Canada senators
Jewish Canadian politicians
Living people
Members of the Order of Ontario
Officers of the Order of Canada
Academic staff of the Queen's University at Kingston
Massey College, Toronto
Academic staff of the University of Toronto
University of Ottawa alumni
Sun Life Financial
Canadian corporate directors
People from Kingston, Ontario
Politicians from Montreal
Politicians from Ottawa
21st-century Canadian politicians
Universal basic income writers
Progressive Conservative Party of Canada leadership candidates